Clervaux railway station is a railway station serving Clervaux, in northern Luxembourg.  It is operated by Chemins de Fer Luxembourgeois, the state-owned railway company.

The station is situated on Line 10, which connects Luxembourg City to the centre and north of the country.

External links

 Official CFL page on Clervaux station
 Rail.lu page on Clervaux station

Railway station
Railway stations in Luxembourg
Railway stations on CFL Line 10